Glady may refer to:

People 
 Glady (surname), a surname of German origin (also "Glöde" or "Gloede")

Places 
United States
Glady, West Virginia 
Glady Fork, a river in West Virginia 
Poland
Glądy, Bartoszyce County in Warmian-Masurian Voivodeship (north Poland)
Glądy, Braniewo County in Warmian-Masurian Voivodeship (north Poland)
Glądy, Ostróda County in Warmian-Masurian Voivodeship (north Poland)